Wieblitz-Eversdorf is a former municipality in the district Altmarkkreis Salzwedel, in Saxony-Anhalt, Germany. It consisted of the villages Eversdorf, Groß Wieblitz and Klein Wieblitz. On 1 January 2011, it was merged into the town Salzwedel.

References

Former municipalities in Saxony-Anhalt
Salzwedel